Gounellea is a genus of beetles in the family Cerambycidae, containing the following species:

 Gounellea bruchi (Gounelle, 1906)
 Gounellea capucina (White, 1846)
 Gounellea dulcissima (White, 1855)
 Gounellea histrio (Gounelle, 1906)

References

Anisocerini